The Itter is a river in Baden-Württemberg and Hesse, Germany. It flows into the Neckar in Eberbach.

See also
List of rivers of Baden-Württemberg
List of rivers of Hesse

References

Rivers of Baden-Württemberg
Rivers of Hesse
Rivers of Germany